Edmond de Bergerac is a French comedy play by Alexis Michalik. Inspired by Shakespeare in Love, the play is set in December 1897 and is about the playwright Edmond Rostand and the creation of his renowned play Cyrano de Bergerac.

Productions 
The play opened in September 2016 at the Théâtre du Palais-Royal in Paris where it is currently running (where it is simply titled Edmond). It won 5 Moliere Awards in 2017.

An English translation by Jeremy Sams opened at the Birmingham Repertory Theatre in March 2019 before touring the UK. The production stars Freddie Fox as Edmond, Henry Goodman as Coquelin, Josie Lawrence as Sarah Bernhardt and Chizzy Akudolu as Maria.

References 

2016 plays
Plays set in France
Plays based on actual events
French plays